Mamadi Camara may refer to:
 Mamadi Camara (soccer, born 1995), Guinean-Canadian soccer forward
 Mamadi Camará (footballer, born 2003), Bissau-Guinean football forward